Benjamin Estil (March 13, 1780 – July 14, 1853) was a U.S. Representative from Virginia.

Biography
Born in Hansonville (now in Russell County), Virginia, Estil received an academic education, and attended Washington Academy (now Washington and Lee University), Lexington, Virginia.
He studied law.
He was admitted to the bar and commenced practice in Abingdon, Virginia.
He served as prosecuting attorney for Washington County.
He served as member of the Virginia House of Delegates during the years 1814–1817.

Estil was elected as an Adams candidate to the Nineteenth Congress (March 4, 1825 – March 3, 1827).
He served as judge of the fifteenth judicial circuit from 1831 until 1852, when he resigned.
He retired to a farm in Oldham County, Kentucky, where he died July 14, 1853.

Sources

1780 births
1853 deaths
Members of the Virginia House of Delegates
County and city Commonwealth's Attorneys in Virginia
Politicians from Abingdon, Virginia
National Republican Party members of the United States House of Representatives from Virginia
19th-century American politicians
People from Russell County, Virginia
19th-century American lawyers
19th-century American judges
Virginia circuit court judges